The 2001 Hopman Cup (also known as the Hyundai Hopman Cup for sponsorship reasons) was a tennis championship won by Switzerland's Martina Hingis and Roger Federer. Hingis and Federer defeated Monica Seles and Jan-Michael Gambill of the United States in the final. The tournament was hosted at the Burswood Entertainment Complex in Perth, Western Australia from 30 December 2000 through 6 January 2001.

Overall standings

Play-off

Belgium vs. Japan

Group A

Teams and standings

South Africa vs. Australia

South Africa vs. Thailand

Switzerland vs. Australia

Switzerland vs. South Africa

Switzerland vs. Thailand

Thailand vs. Australia

Group B

Teams and standings

Belgium vs. Russia

Russia vs. Slovakia

Slovakia vs. Belgium

United States vs. Belgium

United States vs. Russia

United States vs. Slovakia

Final

External links 

Hopman Cups by year
Hopman Cup
Hopman Cup